Ereonora (died 1848) was a high ranking Māori woman of the Te Rarawa iwi (tribe) in northern New Zealand. She is known for signing the Treaty of Waitangi in 28 April 1840. She was one of the few women to sign this document. Her husband Nōpera Panakareao also signed, opposite her name. Ereonora was influential in spreading Christianity throughout her tribe.

Ereanora died in March 1848, and was buried on 22 March with William Puckey reading the lesson, and Joseph Matthews delivering the prayer.

References

1848 deaths
Te Rarawa people
Signatories of the Treaty of Waitangi